Laakirchen (Central Bavarian: Laakircha) is a municipality in the district of Gmunden in the Austrian state of Upper Austria.

Population

Twin towns
Laakirchen is twinned with:

  Obertshausen, Germany, since 1972
  Gemona del Friuli, Italy, since 2000

References

Cities and towns in Gmunden District